Litsea imbricata is a species of plant in the family Lauraceae. It is endemic to New Caledonia.  It is threatened by habitat loss.

References

Endemic flora of New Caledonia
imbricata
Endangered flora of Asia
Taxonomy articles created by Polbot